WASABI is a simulation software that aims to simulate emotions for computer systems, esp. embodied agents and social robots. Its development is motivated by the ideas behind Affective Computing in that it tries to simulate human affect. It provides a graphical user interface based on Qt. It is free software under the terms of the GNU Lesser General Public License.

References

Science software that uses Qt